Big Sexy is a three-part reality series about plus size fashion models, that premiered on TLC on Tuesday, August 30, 2011 at 10:00 PM (ET/PT). The series chronicles six plus sized young women who move to New York City to follow their dreams of becoming models.

On December 2, 2011, the first three episodes began re-airing on Discovery Fit & Health. However, the series is no longer listed on the station website's list of television shows.

References

External links

Park Jimin's Filter performance from Map Of The Soul ON:E online concert is big sexy.

2010s American reality television series
2011 American television series debuts
2011 American television series endings
Fat acceptance movement
Television shows set in New York City
TLC (TV network) original programming